Rainbow Walker is a color-changing action game designed by Steve Coleman for the Atari 8-bit family and published by Synapse Software in 1983. A Commodore 64 port followed. Coleman also wrote another game published by Synapse in 1983, The Pharaoh's Curse.

The Atari version was later part of a  "Double Play" promotion, where some Synapse games had a second, complete game on the other side of the diskette. The Double Play re-release of Rainbow Walker includes the game Countdown by Ken Rose.

Gameplay

The player controls a small creature named Cedrick who hops on a flat rainbow curving into the screen, giving a pseudo 3D quality to the game. The rainbow consists of 8 arcs, each of which contains 16 squares. Hopping along an arc scrolls the rainbow and eventually wraps around to the starting square. Each level omits some parts of this grid to make it more challenging. At the start of each round the squares are gray, and moving onto them adds color. The goal is to color the entire rainbow.

Hopping off the rainbow costs one life. Holding the button while moving jumps over a square.

Other creatures attempt to change the squares back to gray or to knock Cedrick off the rainbow. A shooting star moves along an arc then drops Cedrick off, possibly in a location without a square. A demon bird carries Cedrick into the clouds and undoes all of the coloring done in the level. Fragile squares break if Cedrick stands on them for too long. One offensive opportunity is that if Cedrick steps on a freeze square, then it stops creatures moving for a few seconds during which time they can be stomped on and eliminated.

There are twenty levels in all, with bonus stages between them, and then the game ends. After reaching level five, it is possible to start a new game at that level, though only in the current play session.

Reception
In a 1984 Antic review, Andrew Bell wrote, "Rainbow Walker, Synapse Software's latest arcade-style game, joins the company's previous games as one of the most imaginative, graphically stimulating and playable games on the market." Tracie Forman of Electronic Games called Rainbow Walker, "especially ear-pleasing” and concluded, "a pleasant game that has a way of growing on the player." In a review for InfoWorld, Scott Mace wrote, "...as I played, I grew more and more infatuated with the game. Then it became an obsession. Finally, it had my respect". SoftSide called it "an artistic masterpiece and a lot of fun to play."

In 2014, Retro Gamer included Rainbow Walker on a list of the top ten Atari 8-bit family games.

References

1983 video games
Action video games
Atari 8-bit family games
Commodore 64 games
Synapse Software games
Video games developed in the United States

External links
Rainbow Walker at Atari Mania